Triplophysa kaznakowi is a species of ray-finned fish in the genus Triplophysa.

References

kaznakowi
Taxa named by Artem Mikhailovich Prokofiev
Fish described in 2004